The Saskatoon Quakers were an ice hockey team that was based in Saskatoon, Saskatchewan, Canada. The team played in various senior ice hockey leagues, and later played in minor league professional hockey. The Quakers represented Canada in 1934 World Ice Hockey Championships held in Milan, Italy where they won Gold. In 1952, they captured the President's Cup as Pacific Coast Hockey League champions.

History
The Quakers represented Canada in 1934 World Ice Hockey Championships held in Milan, Italy where they won Gold.

The Quakers were a founding member of the Western Canada Senior Hockey League (WCSHL) in 1945, where they were known their first two seasons as the Saskatoon Elks. They captured the WCSHL championship in 1950–51. The following season, the Quakers joined the Calgary Stampeders and Edmonton Flyers in turning professional as the WCSHL merged with the Pacific Coast Hockey League, which renamed itself the Western Hockey League in the following year. As a result of the merger, the Quakers lost their amateur status, becoming a minor-professional team. The Quakers succumbed, after five seasons in the WHL, to the increased costs of operating a minor-professional team.

When the Quakers won the WCSHL 1950–51 championship, they became the western league's representative to the 1951 Alexander Cup for the national major ('open' to both amateur and professional leagues) senior ice hockey championship of Canada. They would lose to the Toronto St. Michaels Monarchs in the Alexander Cup's semi-finals. In 1952, they captured the President's Cup as Pacific Coast Hockey League champions.

In 1957–58, Saskatoon returned to the WHL, splitting home games with St. Paul, Minnesota as the Saskatoon/St. Paul Regals. The two city concept did not work, and in 1958–59, the team was restored as the Saskatoon Quakers. They would last only that one season before folding.

Season-by-season record
Note: GP = Games played, W = Wins, L = Losses, T = Ties Pts = Points, GF = Goals for, GA = Goals against

See also
List of ice hockey teams in Saskatchewan

References

External links
hockeyleaguehistory.com WCSHL standings
The Old Western Hockey League PCHL/WHL standings

Defunct ice hockey teams in Canada
Defunct sports teams in Saskatchewan
Ice hockey teams in Saskatchewan
Sport in Saskatoon
New York Rangers minor league affiliates
Western Hockey League (1952–1974) teams
Ice hockey teams representing Canada internationally